Ness Point, also known as Lowestoft Ness, is the most easterly point of England, Great Britain, the United Kingdom and the British Isles. It is located in Lowestoft in the East Suffolk district of the county of Suffolk. The site is located to the north of the town centre, overlooking the North Sea, and has a direction marker, known as the Euroscope, marking locations in other countries and their distance from Ness Point.

Located at Ness Point is the previous record holder for Britain's tallest wind turbine, nicknamed "Gulliver".

See also
 Ardnamurchan Point, westernmost point of the British mainland.
 Land's End, westernmost point of mainland England.
 Lizard Point, southernmost point of the British mainland.
 Dunnet Head, northernmost point of the British Mainland.
 Marshall Meadows Bay, northernmost point of England.
 Ness, Lewis, northernmost point of the Outer Hebrides

References

External links
Ness Point - Official Website

Lowestoft